Arthur Devlin may refer to:

Art Devlin (baseball) (1879–1948), American athlete and coach
Art Devlin (ski jumper) (1922–2004), American ski jumper
Ray Devlin (Arthur Ray Devlin, 1926–1995), Australian politician